The Hunger Plan was a partially implemented plan developed by Nazi bureaucrats during World War II to seize food from the Soviet Union and give it to German soldiers and civilians. The plan entailed the genocide by starvation of millions of Soviet citizens following Operation Barbarossa, the 1941 invasion of the Soviet Union (see Generalplan Ost). The premise behind the Hunger Plan was that Germany was not self-sufficient in food supplies; to sustain the war and keep up domestic morale, it needed food from conquered lands at any cost. The plan created a famine as an act of policy, killing millions of people. 

It was developed to prepare for the Wehrmacht (German armed forces) invasion, and provided for diverting Ukrainian foodstuffs away from central and northern Russia into the hands of the invading army and the population in Germany. Its means of mass murder were outlined in several documents, including one that became known as Göring's Green Folder.

Plan 

The architect of the Hunger Plan was Herbert Backe. Together with others, including Heinrich Himmler, Backe led a coalition of Nazi politicians dedicated to securing Germany's food supply. The Hunger Plan may have been decided on almost as soon as Hitler announced his intention to invade the Soviet Union in December 1940. Certainly by 2 May 1941, it was in the advanced stages of planning and was ready for discussion between all the major Nazi state ministries and the Oberkommando der Wehrmacht (OKW) office of economics, headed by General Georg Thomas. The lack of capacity of the Russian railways, the inadequacy of road transport and the shortages of fuel, meant that the German Army would have to feed itself by living off the land in the territories they conquered in the western regions of the Soviet Union. A meeting on 2 May 1941 between the permanent secretaries responsible for logistical planning for the invasion of the Soviet Union, as well as other high-ranking Nazi party functionaries, state officials and military officers, included in its conclusions:

{{quotation|1.) The war can only be continued if the entire Wehrmacht is fed from Russia in the third year of the war.
2.) If we take what we need out of the country, there can be no doubt that tens of millions of people will die of starvation.<ref>Nbg. Doc. 2718–PS, 2 May 1941, printed in International Military Tribunal, ed., Nürnberg, 14. November 1945–1. Oktober 1946, vol. 31. , Nuremberg 1948, p. 84.</ref>}}

The minutes of the meeting exemplify German planning for the occupation of the Soviet Union. They present a deliberate decision on the life and death of vast parts of the local population as a logical, inevitable development. Three weeks later, on 23 May 1941, economic policy guidelines for the coming invasion were produced by Hans-Joachim Riecke's agricultural section of the Economic Staff East, which had direct responsibility for the economic and agricultural exploitation of the soon-to-be occupied Soviet territories:

The perceived grain surpluses of Ukraine figured particularly prominently in the vision of a "self-sufficient" Germany. Hitler himself had stated in August 1939 that Germany needed "the Ukraine, in order that no one is able to starve us again as in the last war". Ukraine did not produce enough grain for export to solve Germany's problems. Scooping off the agricultural surplus in Ukraine for the purpose of feeding the Reich called for:

 annihilation of what the German régime perceived as a superfluous population (Jews, and the population of Ukrainian large cities such as Kiev, which received no supplies at all);
 extreme reduction of rations for Ukrainians in the remaining cities; and
 reduction in foodstuffs consumed by the farming population.

Discussing the plan, Backe noted a "surplus population" in Russia of 20 to 30 million. If that population were cut off from food, it could be used for the invading German Army and the German population. Industrialization had created an urban population of many millions in the Soviet Union. Great suffering among the native Soviet population was envisaged, with tens of millions of deaths expected within the first year of the German occupation. Carefully planned starvation was to be an integral part of the German campaign, and the German planners believed that the assault on the Soviet Union could not succeed without it. According to Gesine Gerhard, German agricultural officials saw the Hunger Plan as a solution to the European food crisis and a method for exterminating the "undesirable" Soviet population.

 Effects of the plan 
The Hunger Plan caused the deaths of millions of citizens in the German-occupied territories of the Soviet Union. The historian Timothy Snyder estimates that "4.2 million Soviet citizens (largely Russians, Belarusians, and Ukrainians) [were] starved by the German occupiers in 1941–1944". Among the victims were many Jews, whom the Nazis forced into ghettos, and Soviet prisoners of war under German control. Jews were prohibited from purchasing eggs, butter, milk, meat or fruit. Tens of thousands of Jews died of hunger and hunger-related causes over  winter 1941–1942.

The most reliable figures for the death rate among Soviet prisoners of war in German captivity reveal that 3.3 million died of a total of 5.7 million captured between June 1941 and February 1945, most of them directly or indirectly from starvation. Of these 3.3 million, 2 million had already died by the beginning of February 1942. The enormous number of deaths was the result of a deliberate policy of starvation directed against Soviet POWs. The German planning staffs had reckoned on capturing and thus having to feed up to two million prisoners within the first eight weeks of the war, i.e. roughly the same number as during the Battle of France in 1940. The number of French, Belgian and Dutch POWs who died in German captivity was extremely low compared with deaths among Soviet POWs.

In spite of the exorbitantly high death rate among Soviet POWs, who constituted the main group of victims of the Hunger Plan, the plan was never fully implemented due to the failure of the German military campaign. The historian Alex J. Kay wrote, "what one is dealing with here is the blueprint for a programme of mass murder unprecedented in modern history". Except in isolated cases, the Germans lacked the manpower to enforce a 'food blockade' of the Soviet cities; neither could they confiscate the food. The Germans were able to significantly supplement their grain stocks, particularly from the granaries in fertile Ukraine, and cut off the Soviets from them, leading to significant starvation in the Soviet-held territories (most drastically in the Siege of Leningrad, where about one million people died). Germans also tried to starve Kiev and Kharkov in German-occupied Ukraine. During the German occupation, about 80,000 residents of Kharkov died of starvation. The lack of food also contributed to the starvation of slaves and concentration camp inmates in Germany.

 Starvation in other German-occupied territories 

The Hunger Plan directed against the population of Soviet cities and grain-deficit territories was unique—the Nazis formulated no other plan against the inhabitants of other German-occupied territories. However, starvation affected other parts of German-occupied Europe, including Greece (more than 300,000 Greeks died of starvation during the Great Famine) and the General Government of Poland. Unlike in the Soviet Union, in Poland the Jewish population in ghettos (especially in the Warsaw Ghetto) suffered the most, although ethnic Poles also faced increasing levels of starvation. Raul Hilberg estimated that "in the whole of occupied Poland 500,000 to 600,000 Jews died in ghettos and labor camps", in part due to starvation. In early 1943, Hans Frank, the German governor of Poland, estimated that three million Poles would face starvation as a result of the Plan. In August, the Polish capital Warsaw was cut off from grain deliveries. Only the bumper harvest of 1943 and the collapsing Eastern Front of 1944 saved the Poles from starvation. Western Europe was third on the German list for the re-distribution of food, which was also shipped to Germany from France and other occupied territories in the West but these were never subjected to the genocidal starvation experienced in the East. As many as 22,000 people died during the Dutch famine of 1944–1945 as a result of an embargo placed by the Germans on transporting food into the country.

The Jewish ration supplied a mere 7.5 percent of human daily needs; Polish rations only 26 percent. Only the rations allocated to Germans fulfilled the full needs of their daily caloric intake.

 See also 
 Effect of the Siege of Leningrad on the city
 Extermination of Soviet prisoners of war by Nazi Germany
 The Holocaust
 Final Solution
 Lebensraum War crimes of the Wehrmacht

 References 

 Bibliography 
 Wigbert Benz: Der Hungerplan im "Unternehmen Barbarossa" 1941. Wissenschaftlicher Verlag Berlin, Berlin 2011, .
 Christopher Browning: The Origins of the Final Solution.  The Evolution of Nazi Jewish Policy, September 1939 – March 1942. With contributions by Jürgen Matthäus. Lincoln, University of Nebraska Press and Jerusalem, Yad Vashem 2004, .
 Lizzie Collingham: The Taste of War: World War Two and the Battle for Food. Allen Lane, 2011, .
 
 Christian Gerlach: Kalkulierte Morde. Die deutsche Wirtschafts- und Vernichtungspolitik in Weißrussland 1941 bis 1944. Hamburger Edition, Hamburg 1998, .
 
 
 
 
 Alex J. Kay: "'The Purpose of the Russian Campaign is the Decimation of the Slavic Population by Thirty Million': The Radicalization of German Food Policy in early 1941", in: Alex J. Kay, Jeff Rutherford and David Stahel, eds., Nazi Policy on the Eastern Front, 1941: Total War, Genocide, and Radicalization. (Rochester Studies in East and Central Europe, Vol. 9) University of Rochester Press, Rochester, NY, 2012, pp. 101–129.
 Timothy Snyder: Bloodlands. Europe between Hitler and Stalin''. The Bodley Head, London 2010, pp. xiv, 162–188, 411.

External links 
 Nazi Hunger Plan

Economy of Nazi Germany
Genocides in Europe
Famines in the Soviet Union
Military history of Germany during World War II
Nazi war crimes
Wehrmacht
Nazi war crimes in the Soviet Union